Andrew Wood (c.1617– 1695) was a Scottish minister who served as Protestant Bishop of Caithness.

Life

The son of Rev David Wood, Church of Scotland minister for the parish of Edzell, by a daughter of John Guthrie, Bishop of Moray, he followed his father's career in the ministry. He studied at St Andrews University graduating MA in 1634.

He became minister at Spott in 1643 under the patronage of William the Earl of Roxburghe and in February 1665 he translated to Dunbar, both in East Lothian. In May 1675 he was made Bishop of the Isles in 1680 became Bishop of Caithness. He received dispensation from the king to hold this bishopric while retaining Dunbar.

He held the position of Bishop of Caithness until the Revolution of 1688, when  episcopacy was abolished in Scotland and all Church of Scotland bishops lost their sees. He died in Dunbar in 1695, aged 76.

References

 , pp. 218, 310

17th-century births
1695 deaths
Bishops of Caithness
Bishops of the Isles
People from East Lothian
Members of the Convention of the Estates of Scotland 1678
Members of the Parliament of Scotland 1681–1682
Members of the Parliament of Scotland 1685–1686
Scottish Restoration bishops